Sir George Henry Dashwood, 5th Baronet (c. 1790 – 4 March 1862) was an English landowner and politician who sat in the House of Commons in two periods between 1832 and 1865.

Dashwood was the eldest son of Sir John Dashwood-King, 4th Baronet, and his wife Mary Ann Broadhead. He was educated at Eton College and the University of Oxford. Unlike his father, a Tory who resisted the Reform Bill, George was a progressive Whig and Liberal, making their relationship somewhat cool. Sir John much preferred his estate at Halton House to that at West Wycombe Park, so George took up residence in the latter shortly after marrying his mother's niece, Elizabeth Broadhead (d. 24 May 1889), daughter of Theodore Henry Broadhead, on 17 March 1823.

Sir John left politics in 1831, in the face of popular agitation for electoral Reform, and George stood for Parliament the following year, being returned as Member of Parliament for Buckinghamshire. He held that seat until 1835. In 1837, he was returned for the borough of Wycombe, formerly his father's seat, and remained one of its Members of Parliament until his death in 1865.

Dashwood succeeded his father in the baronetcy in 1849. He liquidated his grandfather's estates in Lincolnshire and Wales, in 1851, and used the money so raised to overhaul the estate at West Wycombe. He also sold off the contents of Halton House in 1849, and the estate itself in 1853.

Dashwood died at West Wycombe Park aged 71. With no issue, he was succeeded by his brother John, leaving his wife Elizabeth as life tenant of West Wycombe. She subsequently built St Paul's Church at West Wycombe.

References

External links 
 

1790 births
1862 deaths
Baronets in the Baronetage of Great Britain
Liberal Party (UK) MPs for English constituencies
UK MPs 1832–1835
UK MPs 1837–1841
UK MPs 1841–1847
UK MPs 1847–1852
UK MPs 1852–1857
UK MPs 1857–1859
UK MPs 1859–1865
English landowners
People educated at Eton College
Alumni of the University of Oxford
19th-century British businesspeople